Hou Jie (1931–2000) was a People's Republic of China politician. He was born in Luan County, Hebei Province. He was governor of Heilongjiang Province.

1931 births
2000 deaths
People's Republic of China politicians from Hebei
Chinese Communist Party politicians from Hebei
Governors of Heilongjiang
People from Luanzhou